This is a list of members of the Victorian Legislative Council from the elections of  31 August – 2 October 1860 to the elections of 1 September – 2 October 1862.

There were six Electoral Provinces and five members elected to each Province.

Note the "Term in Office" refers to that members term(s) in the Council, not necessarily for that Province.

 Clarke resigned January 1861, replaced by Joseph Sutherland in February 1861

References

 Re-member (a database of all Victorian MPs since 1851). Parliament of Victoria.

Members of the Parliament of Victoria by term
19th-century Australian politicians